Anil Chaudhary (born 12 March 1965) is an Indian cricket umpire. He stood in his first Twenty20 International (T20I) on 10 October 2013, between India and Australia. He stood in his first One Day International (ODI) on 27 November 2013, between India and the West Indies. In January 2018, he was named as one of the seventeen on-field umpires for the 2018 Under-19 Cricket World Cup. In January 2020, he was named as one of the sixteen umpires for the 2020 Under-19 Cricket World Cup tournament in South Africa.

In January 2021, the International Cricket Council (ICC) named him as one of the on-field umpires for the first Test match between India and England. On 5 February 2021, he stood in his first Test as an onfield umpire, between India and England.

See also
 List of Test cricket umpires
 List of One Day International cricket umpires
 List of Twenty20 International cricket umpires

References

1965 births
Living people
Indian Test cricket umpires
Indian One Day International cricket umpires
Indian Twenty20 International cricket umpires
Cricketers from Delhi